David Marrero and Rubén Ramírez Hidalgo were the defending champions but Marrero decided not to participate.
Hidalgo played alongside Daniel Muñoz de la Nava.
Daniel Gimeno-Traver and Iván Navarro defeated Colin Ebelthite and Jaroslav Pospíšil 6–2, 4–6, [10–7] in the final to win the title.

Seeds

Draw

Draw

References
 Main Draw

Doubles